Chlorella rotunda is a euryhaline, unicellular microalga in the Division Chlorophyta. It is spherical to oval-shaped, is solitary and lacks a mucilaginous envelope.

References

Further reading

Bashan, Yoav, et al. "Chlorella sorokiniana (formerly C. vulgaris) UTEX 2714, a non-thermotolerant microalga useful for biotechnological applications and as a reference strain." Journal of Applied Phycology (2015): 1–9.
Krienitz, Lothar, et al. "Genotypic diversity of Dictyosphaerium–morphospecies (Chlorellaceae, Trebouxiophyceae) in African inland waters, including the description of four new genera." Fottea 12 (2012): 231–253.

External links
AlgaeBase

rotunda